Sasquatched! The Musical is a two-act musical written by Phil Darg in 2012. The piece is a musical comedy that depicts "Bigfoot" (Arthur the Sasquatch) as a talking, intelligent, and dignified creature whose sudden presence in the fictional Columbia National Park precipitates a series of humorous encounters with quirky locals. Set to a pop-rock musical score, Arthur does his best to convince the park patrons that he is worthy of their respect and friendship – while countering "Bigfoot" stereotypes and eluding the watchful eye of the media, who are attempting to expose and exploit Arthur and all of the Sasquatches.

Sasquatched! The Musical was selected as a finalist in the 2013 New York Musical Theatre Festival's Next Link project on January 11, 2013. On March 1, 2013, it was chosen for a full production in the festival. Performance dates (and venue) have yet to be set, however the play will be performed at least five times between July 8, 2013 and July 28, 2013.

Sasquatched! The Musical blurb:

Bigfoot exists! Arthur – a kindhearted, talking Sasquatch – is lost when he is befriended by a young boy, Sam. Together, they encounter quirky locals and elude a ruthless TV crew investigating "Bigfoot" – as the stage erupts into hilarious social commentary on human-Sasquatch relations and a rockin’ musical romp through the woods.

Musical numbers:

 Is That What They Think of Me?
 Eight Feet Tall (and Smelled Like a Skunk)
 Welcome to Bigfoot Central
 Helicopter Parents Are We
 Shake the Camera
 Starts With You
 Rhubarb!
 Lost in the Woods
 I'm An Eco-Friendly . . . Park Ranger
 You Don't Know Me
 Landslides, Earthquakes, Tremors and Volcanoes
 Exposure
 Reinforce the Legend
 Welcome to Bigfoot Central (Reprise)

The show is also the origin of the term "Sasquatch-American" and the phrase "Everything useful starts with you."

Sasquatched! The Musical ran for the second time in Minneapolis in June–July 2014 in a production managed and produced by Imagined Theatre (a non-profit organization dedicated to the creation and development of new musical theatre works). The run included three separate venues and sets of dates, including outdoor performances at the Maple Grove Town Green Amphitheater – one of which was seen by an audience of 500 persons. The show was also performed at the Sabes Theater and the Old Arizona Theatre - both in Minneapolis.

In October 2014, Sasquatched! The Musical was made available for public licensing and production under the StageRights organization.

References
 Sasquatched! The Musical website
 The New York Musical Theatre Festival
 NYMF Sasquatched! The Musical page
 Playbill announcement

2012 musicals